Fotini Pipili is a Greek journalist and politician and member of the Greek Parliament for the New Democracy for the Athens A constituency.

She was born in Athens, on 7 February 1950, and started her career as a journalist from the woman's magazine PANTHEON (Greek: ΠΑΝΘΕΟΝ). She has studied law in the Aristotelian University of Thessaloniki.

In 1973, during the military junta, she became the first female reporter in the state military television channel IENED.

She was member of the Town Council of Athens from 1986 to 1994. In February 2006 she was acting mayor for a week replacing Dora Bakoyannis.

In 2007 she was elected MP of the Greek Parliament for the first time. She retained her seat in the 2009 elections.

In March 2010, she starred in the Greek version of "Dancing with the Stars" on channel ANT1.

References

External links 
Personal blog

1950 births
Living people
Greek MPs 2007–2009
Journalists from Athens
New Democracy (Greece) politicians
Mayors of Athens
Women mayors of places in Greece
Greek MPs 2009–2012
Greek MPs 2012 (May)
Greek MPs 2012–2014
21st-century Greek politicians
21st-century Greek women politicians
Politicians from Athens
Greek MPs 2019–2023